Wyt, or WYT, may refer to:

 The Play of Wyt and Science, a mid-sixteenth-century English morality play written by John Redford
 Wyt, an archaic spelling of wit, a form of intelligent humour
 WYT, the National Rail code for Wythall railway station in  Worcestershire, UK

See also 
 Wit (disambiguation)